Madison Academy is a Seventh-day Adventist academy located in Madison, Tennessee.  It is a part of the Seventh-day Adventist education system, the world's second largest Christian school system. Established in 1904 under the visionary inspiration of Ellen White, Madison Academy is co-educated day high school located approximately ten miles north of Nashville, Tennessee, on a bend of the Cumberland River.

General information
The Academy is owned and operated by the Kentucky-Tennessee Conference of Seventh-day Adventists, and the school primarily serves students of the Seventh-day Adventist backgrounds and families from the Nashville community.

The three entities of the school include its educational program, its linen services industry, and nearly 60 units of rental property.  About 40 full-time or part-time workers make up its staff team.  Of these, 11 are credentialed teachers.

Madison Academy is a member of the Association of Seventh-day Adventist Secondary Schools and is accredited by the General Conference Board of Regents as well as by the State of Tennessee.  The last full-scale evaluation of the school was conducted in 2007.

Who May Attend

Madison Academy admits students of any race or national origin to all rights and privileges generally accorded or made available to students at the academy, and makes no discrimination in the administration of educational policies, scholarships or loans, work, or extracurricular activities.

Chrome Book Program

Madison Academy is issuing Chrome Books to each of its students to use for study purposes.  Almost all textbooks are on these Laptops.

Student Pledge

"As a student at Madison Academy, I pledge to understand and uphold all the standards outlined here in the Student Handbook, on and off campus, and on school trips.  It is my intention to be a representative as a student of Madison Academy in my spirit and performance."

Outreach and Community Service

Madison Academy performs many different outreach programs, which include: Appalachian Outreach, MGM (Madison Global Missions), Community Service Day, and other outreach programs.

Appalachian Outreach
For the last 22 years, Appalachian Outreach has been an integral part of the program at Madison Academy.  Over the years, other schools have joined with Madison Academy in the annual outreach.  Around 100 students and faculty from Madison Academy participate in this annual outreach program.  
Facebook page 
www.facebook.com/group.php?gid=52933932014

Madison Global Missions
Every year, students, faculty, and parents from Madison Academy travel to different parts of the world for the annual mission trip. Some of the more recent countries visited are the Dominican Republic in 2004, South Africa in 2005, Peru in 2006, and the Amazon Rainforest in 2007. The original 2007 mission trip was scheduled to go to the island of Fiji, but had to relocate to the Amazon due to the recent 2006 Fijian coup d'état. The upcoming 2008 trip will venture to Argentina and will be a joint trip between the school's choir group, the Madisonians, and the normal mission trip.  2006 Fijian coup d'état

Athletics
Basketball
Starting in 2012, it has been heavily supported by the students and parents. The academy previously did not have any inter-scholastics sports and basketball was the most wanted by the students.

Soccer Team
New in 2012, Madison has a soccer team.

Intramurals
Madison Academy is one of the many Seventh-day Adventist schools around the United States that runs an intramural program. The sports include softball and flag football in the fall, volleyball in the winter, and basketball and floor hockey in the spring.

ACROS
One thing that Madison Academy is known for is its gymnastics team, the ACROS. Every year they showcase their talent at the regional ACROFest held at Highland Academy, as well as the school-year-ending Homeshow.

Academics
The required curriculum includes classes in the following subject areas: Religion, English, Oral Communications, Social Studies, Mathematics, Science, Physical Education, Health, Computer Applications, Fine Arts, and Electives.

Spiritual aspects
All students take religion classes each year that they are enrolled in. These classes cover topics in biblical history and Christian and denominational doctrines. Instructors in other disciplines also begin each class period with prayer or a short devotional thought, many of which encourage student input. Weekly, the entire student body gathers together in the auditorium for an hour-long chapel service.
Outside the classrooms there is year-round spiritually oriented programming that relies on student involvement.

Extra-curricular Activities
Madison Academy offers a wide selection of extracurricular activities for students. They include:
 Art
 Band
 Choir
 Drama
 Gymnastics
 Music Appreciation

See also

 List of Seventh-day Adventist secondary schools
 Seventh-day Adventist education

References

External links

Private high schools in Tennessee
Adventist secondary schools in the United States
Schools in Nashville, Tennessee